Ivan Radnev Ivanov (born 19 December 1968) is a Bulgarian wrestler. He competed in the men's Greco-Roman 62 kg at the 1996 Summer Olympics. He invented the Bulgarian Bag  at around 2005.

References

External links
 

1968 births
Living people
Bulgarian male sport wrestlers
Olympic wrestlers of Bulgaria
Wrestlers at the 1996 Summer Olympics
People from Stara Zagora Province
World Wrestling Championships medalists